Lucas Qvistorff Andersen (born 13 September 1994) is a Danish professional footballer who plays as a winger for Danish side AaB.

Club career

AaB
Andersen started playing youth football with Aalborg Freja, before moving to Aalborg BK (AaB) at the age of 10. In September 2008, Andersen went on a one week trial at Liverpool at the age of only 14, without getting offered a contract. He penned his first professional contract with AaB in September 2009.

Andersen made his debut for AaB on 5 March 2011 at the age of 16 years and 174 days, making him the youngest player ever to play for AaB in the top-flight Danish Superliga championship and the second youngest player ever to play in the Danish Superliga. One month later, he extended his contract until 2013. He slowly became a regular part of, as he played 22 league matches for AaB in the 2011/12 season. He broke his toe in November 2011 and was out for the rest of the fall. According to a Danish source, Andersen was followed by Liverpool and Ajax in the January 2012 market. This was later confirmed by his agent.

Andersen was usually employed as a right winger, but was capable of playing on the left, as well as an attacking midfielder/playmaker behind the forwards. He was touted as the most promising player to come through the AaB youth ranks since Jesper Grønkjær, by AaB director of football Lynge Jakobsen A number of foreign clubs wanted to sign him by 2012, but Lynge Jakobsen did not want to sell Andersen at too young an age.

Ajax
On 31 August 2012, Andersen signed with Ajax for an undisclosed fee, with a view to join the squad of Jong Ajax at first. AaB's good relationship with Ajax, having sold Jesper Grønkjær to Ajax as well, was emphasized by Lynge Jakobsen as a reason for the deal materializing.
Andersen made his debut 8 December, coming on as a substitute against FC Groningen.

Grasshopper
On 4 July 2016, Ajax announced that Andersen had been sold to Grasshopper Club Zürich.

Return to AaB
After a less successful 2017–18 season at Grasshoppers with limited playing time, Andersen was loaned out to his former club, AaB, for the 2018–19 season. Andersen had strong performances for the club which made AaB buy him out of his contract with Grasshoppers, making the deal permanent from 1 July 2019. Andersen signed a five-year contract. Andersen was named the new captain of AaB after long time veteran Rasmus Würtz ended his playing career.

International career
He was a part of the Denmark under-17 squad at the 2011 UEFA European Under-17 Football Championship and the 2011 FIFA U-17 World Cup.

On 8 January 2012, he was called up for the Denmark League XI national football team for their matches in the 2011 King's Cup. With his age of only 17 years and 4 months, he is the youngest player ever to have been a part of the Danish League XI squad.

Career statistics

Honours

Club
Ajax
 Eredivisie: 2012–13, 2013–14
 Johan Cruijff Shield: 2013

References

Lucas A. starter op hos Jong Ajax, bold.dk, 20 June 2016

External links
 Voetbal International profile 
 Official Superliga statistics
 Stats on 7msport

1994 births
Living people
Sportspeople from Aalborg
Association football midfielders
Danish men's footballers
Danish expatriate men's footballers
Danish Superliga players
AaB Fodbold players
Eredivisie players
Eerste Divisie players
AFC Ajax players
Willem II (football club) players
Grasshopper Club Zürich players
Denmark under-21 international footballers
Denmark international footballers
Expatriate footballers in the Netherlands
Swiss Super League players